Virynskyi Zavod (Viryn Plant, Ukrainian: Віринський Завод) is a terminus railway station in Mykolaivka, Sumy Oblast, Ukraine. The station serves as a terminus for the Ambary-Virynskyi Zavod line as well as a freight train station. It is on the Sumy Directorate of Southern Railways on the Ambary-Virynskyi Zavod line.

Only suburban trains  - Virynskyi Zavod and Sumy - Virynskyi Zavod run at the station.

Notes

 Tariff Guide No. 4. Book 1 (as of 05/15/2021) (Russian) Archived 05/15/2021.
 Ukraine. Atlas of Railways. Mirilo 1: 750 000. - K .: DNVP "Cartography", 2008. - 80 p. - ISBN 978-966-475-082-7.

References

External links
Virynskyi Zavod station on railwayz.info
Schedule for suburban trains

Railway stations in Sumy Oblast
Sumy
Buildings and structures in Sumy Oblast